Michael or Mike Tyler may refer to:

Michael J. Tyler, South Australian academic
Mike Tyler, non-academic, post-beat American poet
Ty Hensley (Michael Tyler Hensley, born 1993), American baseball player
Michael Lawrence Tyler, real name of Mystikal, American rapper and actor

See also